The following highways are numbered 487:

Brazil
SP-487

Canada
Manitoba Provincial Road 487

Japan
 Japan National Route 487

United States
  Interstate 487 (cancelled proposal)
  Nevada State Route 487
  Pennsylvania Route 487
  Puerto Rico Highway 487
  Farm to Market Road 487
  Wyoming Highway 487